Andrea Sbraga (born 14 January 1992) is an Italian professional footballer who plays as a centre back for  club Potenza.

Club career
On 15 July 2021 Sbraga joined Avellino. On 27 January 2022, he moved to Turris on loan. Sbraga's contract with Avellino was terminated by mutual consent on 31 January 2023.

On 7 February 2023, Sbraga signed with Potenza.

References

External links 
 
 
 

1992 births
Living people
Footballers from Rome
Italian footballers
Association football defenders
Serie C players
Atletico Roma F.C. players
S.S. Lazio players
Pisa S.C. players
U.S. Salernitana 1919 players
Carrarese Calcio players
Calcio Padova players
A.C.N. Siena 1904 players
Novara F.C. players
S.S. Arezzo players
U.S. Avellino 1912 players
S.S. Turris Calcio players
Potenza Calcio players